Xavier High School, Albury is an independent Catholic systemic secondary day school for boys and girls, located in Albury, New South Wales, Australia.

Xavier High School is supported and partially funded by the Catholic School's Office, Diocese of Wagga Wagga, continuing a long history of Catholic education in the region, forming from the amalgamation of St Joseph's College for girls and the Aquinas Boys College in 1983. The school caters for over 900 students from Year 7 to Year 12. The Principal of the school is Gavin Dykes with the school motto reading "The Truth Will Set You Free"- a direct reference to the Gospel of John, verse 8:32.

History and amalgamation 

Catholic schooling in the Albury region has experienced a long and successful tradition, dating back to 1868, wherein the Sisters of Mercy established St Brigid's College on a small block of land owned by St Patrick's Parish, in South Albury. In 1885, Patrician Brothers opened a school for boys in an adjacent block in Olive Street, also owned by St Patrick's Parish. This school for boys was re-inaugurated by the Congregation of Christian Brothers in 1917, the same year St Brigid's College was redeveloped and renamed, St Joseph's Ladies College.

For the majority of a decade, The Sisters of Mercy and Christian Brothers delivered Catholic-based education to thousands of students across the area. All teaching during this time period was performed by clergy of the Church, linking closely with St Patrick's Parish. In 1959, a northern campus of the Boys College was established in Fallon Street North Albury, the site of the present day Xavier High. This establishment was named Aquinas College. In 1983, the boys and girls schools were amalgamated to create a co-educational system under the name "Xavier High School", named after Saint Francis Xavier. The campuses remained separated until January 2001 wherein the school united to share the redeveloped Northern campus, the site of the present day school.

The school promotes its history to the student body, with many of the 8 Houses within the school named after the aforementioned colleges.
Today, the school employs over 60 teaching staff in addition to numerous support staff and several volunteers.
Additionally, continual redevelopment of facilities and structural expansion is currently in progress to accommodate the increasing number of enrolled students at the school.

Facilities 

Xavier High School has undergone considerable development since its establishment, resulting in a host of educational facilities available for students, including:
 a brand new indoor stadium, complete with elevated stage, stage lighting and an audio-booth, mezzanine seating for 150, fold out terraced seating for a further 200, and a total capacity with stored temporary seating of 1,200; equipped with a surface catering for a range of indoor sports including basketball and indoor soccer as well as PDHPE practical classes
 a 200-seat Arts Centre, complete with elevated stage, stage lighting and audio-booth
 2 Music rooms
 3 Visual Arts rooms
 3 sound-proof music/tuition rooms assisting in private study, with recording equipment
 a re-surfaced outdoor soccer/basketball court and access to 3 large sporting ovals
 4 fully equipped science laboratories and laboratory preparation room
 2 Computer rooms, offering internet access and a range of software programs
 a library with a range of fiction and non-fiction reference materials and an adjacent classroom
 2 fully equipped Hospitality kitchens
 modern Industrial Technology workshop, catering for a range of Industrial and VET-based subjects
 a textiles room
 recently refurbished/re-landscaped quadrangles
 access to a developing wetland and rainwater recycling facility
 a relatively recently constructed block of 5 classrooms
 4 recently constructed student locker bays 
 toilet facilities

Houses 

Xavier hosts an annual House-Cup competition between the 8 House groups of Xavier High School, with points awarded for House achievement and participation in sporting carnivals and events, fundraising, inter-house trivia and novelty events such as Melbourne Cup Day celebrations. 

Each House is briefly described below, outlining of the House leaders for 2010:
 Aquinas "Enlightenment through learning, faith through understanding". Named after St Thomas Aquinas and Aquinas College, Aquinas is represented by the colour maroon.
 Clark "Persistence, task completion, fitness, working joyfully". Named after Thelma Clark, the first lay teacher of St Joseph's Ladies College, Clark is represented by the colour gold.
 Dynan "Gentleness, inner strength, striving for excellence, preserving what is good". Named in honour of Brother Dynan, a pioneer of Aquinas College, Dynan is represented by the colour red.
 Joseph "Simplicity, Love of work, courage, faith". Traditionally, Joseph is named in honour of Joseph, the father of Jesus Christ, in addition to recognising St Joseph's Ladies College. Joseph is represented by the colour white.
 Loreto "Holy place- in the way of Mary, loving and thoughtful". Loreto house is named after the village wherein the house of Mary the Mother of Jesus is situated and is represented by the colour blue.
 MacKillop "Faith Bravery and Strength- forthright and battling adversity". Mackillop is named in honour of Sister Mary MacKillop, who was canonised as the first Saint born in Australia. MacKillop is represented by the colour green
 McAuley "Working with others, leadership, dignity of all people, courage and compassion". McAuley House is named after Catherine McAuley, founder of the Sisters of Mercy and is represented by the colour purple.
 Rice "To do, to lead and learn, working for others". Rice House is named after Edmund Rice, advocate for disadvantaged education and inspiration for the Christian Brothers and is represented by the colour orange.

Sports and extra-curricular 

In addition to a focus on academia and Catholic education, Xavier High School is represented in a number of sporting activities, including;
 School based Athletics, Swimming and Cross-country carnivals
 BISSA level individual and team sports
 CCC level individual and team sports
 A range of state-level and national individual and team sports

Sports focused on at Xavier High School primarily include Australian Rules Football, Soccer, Basketball, Swimming, Athletics, Cross-country running, Hockey, Golf, Rugby league, Touch Football and Cricket.

Current extra curricular activities include Musical Performance evenings, Art Exhibitions, Musicals/Stage Productions and involvement in ANZAC day services/supporting Legacy.

Extra curricular activities formerly run at Xavier High School included Blood Donation through the local Vampire Shield, Rotary Debating, and Local "Mock-trials", in addition to involvement in cultural events such as the LOTE (Languages other than English) festival.

The House-Cup winners for 2010 were Aquinas House, led by House Coordinator Jo Gleeson and House Captain Thomas Freeman and Julia Rossiter.

See also 

 Albury High School
 List of non-government schools in New South Wales
 Catholic education in Australia

References

External links

Educational institutions established in 1983
Catholic secondary schools in New South Wales
Schools in Albury, New South Wales
1983 establishments in Australia
Former Congregation of Christian Brothers schools in Australia
Roman Catholic Diocese of Wagga Wagga